Ilona Hoeksma (born 22 May 1991) is a Dutch former professional racing cyclist, who last rode for UCI Women's Team .

Major results

2013
 10th EPZ Omloop van Borsele
2015
 5th Parel van de Veluwe
 10th Ronde van Overijssel
2016
 7th Overall Tour of Chongming Island
2017
 4th Diamond Tour
2018
 9th Omloop van de IJsseldelta

See also
 2014 Parkhotel Valkenburg Continental Team season
 2015 Parkhotel Valkenburg Continental Team season

References

External links

1991 births
Living people
Dutch female cyclists
People from Opsterland
Cyclists from Friesland
20th-century Dutch women
21st-century Dutch women